Underwater construction is industrial construction in an underwater environment. There is often, but not necessarily, a significant component of commercial diving involved. It is a part of the marine construction industry.

Scope and applications 
Underwater construction is common in the civil engineering, coastal engineering, energy, and petroleum extraction industries.

Civil engineering 
Construction below the water table is mostly managed by using cofferdams or pressurised caissons to exclude water sufficiently to work above the local water level within the enclosure, though it may also be possible to keep the water level down by pumping it out as fast as it seeps in, thereby artificially lowering the water table at the worksite.
Dams, reservoirs, canals, locks
 Bridges and causeways over bodies of water often require foundation structure below water level. Usually this is done using coffer dams and caissons, which themselves may involve underwater work.

Coastal engineering 

Coastal engineering is a branch of civil engineering concerned with the specific demands posed by constructing at or near the coast, as well as the development of the coast itself.

Harbours, docks, breakwaters, jetties, piers, wharfs and similar structures are all immediately adjacent to, or project into coastal waters, and are supported in part by seabed.

Stormwater and sewer outfalls require pipelines to be laid underwater.

Dykes, levees, navigation channels, canals, locks.

Energy infrasructure 
 Inshore and offshore wind farms
 Tidal power and wave power generation
 Hydroelectric plant
 Power station cooling system intakes and outfalls

Offshore petroleum extraction 
 Marine wellhead completions
 Offshore moorings
 Subsea pipelines

Relevant technology 
 Civil engineering
 Coastal engineering
 Structural engineering
 Underwater concrete placement – Tremie, skip, pumping, toggle bags, bagwork. Grouted aggregate. 
 Underwater rock blasting
 Dredging
 Piledriving
 Caissons and cofferdams
 Underwater surveying: site surveys and geological surveys
 Underwater inspection
 Underwater welding
 Commercial diving
 Hyperbaric work
 Corrosion protection

Occupational safety and health issues 
Underwater work by divers on construction sites is generally within the scope of Diving regulations. The work may also come within the scope of other occupational heath and safety related regulations.

Organisations

Civilian

Military 
 US Navy Underwater Construction Teams

See also

References

Construction
Underwater work